|}

The River Eden Fillies' Stakes is a Listed flat horse race in Great Britain open to mares and fillies aged three years or over. It is run over a distance of 1 mile and 5 furlongs (2,615 metres) at Lingfield Park in late October or early November.

The race was first run in 2006.

Winners

See also 
Horse racing in Great Britain
List of British flat horse races

References 
Racing Post: 

Lingfield Park Racecourse
Flat races in Great Britain
Long-distance horse races for fillies and mares
Recurring sporting events established in 2006
2006 establishments in England